Grasshopper mice are rodents of the genus Onychomys, occurring in North America. They feed on insects and other arthropods.

Biology
The three species in this genus of New World mice are only distantly related to the common house mouse, Mus musculus. They are endemic to the United States and Mexico. Its behavior is distinct from other mice.

It is a carnivorous rodent, dining on insects (such as grasshoppers), worms, spiders, centipedes, mantis, scorpions, snakes, and even other mice. It also stalks its prey in the manner of a cat, sneaking up quietly, and defends its territory by "howling" like a small wolf. The grasshopper mouse is known to be immune to various venoms released by its prey (scorpions, snakes, etc.). Grasshopper mice are nocturnal and avoid exposure to bright light.

Ecology

Diet
Grasshopper mice prey on highly venomous arthropods. One example is centipedes that normally kill lesser mice by injecting deadly toxin through their venomous forcipules. Grasshopper mice move swiftly, while centipedes can only inject their toxin if their prey is held by the centipede's needle-sharp claws. The mouse is agile enough to stay out of the reach of the centipede's claws. The mouse attacks by repeatedly biting through the centipede's hard exoskeleton. Each attack on the centipede damages its central nervous system, until the centipede is paralyzed and the grasshopper mouse can eat it safely.

Another example of a venomous arthropod is the bark scorpion (Centruroides sculpturatus). The grasshopper mouse survives in the deserts of southwest United States by feeding on the bark scorpion, which are plentiful, due to other resources being less common.

Their aggressive nature extends beyond their hunting habits: when held in captivity with other mice, they will often kill and eat those other mice. However, they have a disadvantage when it involves capturing in open areas because of their short legs and wide bodies (which reduces their speed). Fortunately, due to their ability to maneuver well, they are able to move quickly in narrow areas allowing them to capture their prey more efficiently.

Physiology

Pain tolerance
The bark scorpion and the grasshopper mouse have been coevolving with each other so closely that it has affected their physiology. The scorpion uses its stinger to inject toxins into the nervous and muscle tissues which causes disruption in the animal's sensory system. However, as the scorpions stinger evolves to become more toxic, the mice evolve in order to cope with the toxins. Therefore, the grasshopper mice have sensory neurons that have evolved which reject the toxins and prevents pain signals. Researchers now know that the grasshopper mouse barely notices the intensifying sting due to a mutation in the cellular pathway that controls their pain response. Compared to the normal house mouse, the grasshopper mouse has one more amino acid in the protein making up the sodium channel Na+ nav1.8. This change prevents the mouse from processing Na+ currents when injected with the scorpion's venom, which blocks action potential propagation and induces analgesia. By having a better understanding of the grasshopper mouses's cellular mutation, scientists can conduct more research and eventually develop a pain relieving drug.

Communication 
Onychomys have six different vocalization types (two neonatal and four adult). They have a wide range of calls that can distinguish them between species, sex, and individuals. For example, the larger mice tend to have deeper voices. When they feel attacked, they will let out a rapid screech/bark.

Species
 Mearns's grasshopper mouse or Chihuahuan grasshopper mouse Onychomys arenicola
 Northern grasshopper mouse, Onychomys leucogaster
 Southern grasshopper mouse, Onychomys torridus

References

 The Mammals of Texas:  Mearns' grasshopper mouse
 The Mammals of Texas:  Northern grasshopper mouse
 University of Michigan Animal Diversity Web:  Genus Onychomys

Onychomys
Mouse, Grasshopper